Munroe station was a commuter rail station in the Munroe Hill neighbourhood of Lexington, Massachusetts, serving the Lexington Branch of the Massachusetts Bay Transportation Authority (MBTA) Commuter Rail system. The depot was located near Munroe Tavern.

History
The small wooden station was replaced with a  station building in November 1903. It was demolished in 1959, though trains continued to stop.  Lexington Branch service ended after a snowstorm blocked the line on January 10, 1977.>

References

External links

Former MBTA stations in Massachusetts